The 1900 Duquesne Country and Athletic Club football season was the sixth and final season of play for the professional American football team representing the Duquesne Country and Athletic Club (DC&AC). Led by third-year captain and coach Roy Jackson, the team compiled a 9–2 record and outscored its opponents by an aggregate 183–23.

Season summary
The team was unable to keep its roster intact from its dominant previous season as several players, including star backs J. A. Gammons and Dave Fultz, were lured by higher salaries to the Homestead Library & Athletic Club. Nevertheless, the DC&AC found sufficient replacements to remain strong.

The DC&AC and other athletic clubs in the Pittsburgh area were plagued throughout the season by bad weather, which suppressed attendance and caused financial losses. The DC&AC did not recover to play another season.

Schedule

References

Duquesne Country and Athletic Club
Duquesne Country and Athletic Club seasons
Duquesne Country and Athletic Club